Dracul may refer to: 

 Vlad II Dracul (1390s–1447),  a Wallachia noble, father of the figure later known as "Vlad the Impaler",
 Mircea III Dracul, a prince of Wallachia
 Dracul (novel), a 2018 prequel to Bram Stoker's Dracula written by Dacre Stoker and J. D. Barker

See also 
 Dracu (disambiguation)
 Dracula (disambiguation)
 Drăculea (disambiguation)
 Valea Dracului (disambiguation)